Chak No.9/14L is a village of Chichawatni Tehsil, Sahiwal District, Punjab, Pakistan. It is 25 km away from Chichawatni Tehsil. The population of the village is 15000 and around 2000 houses.

Name of village
Like other villages of the area the village is popular by its village name chak no9/14.L.
The original name of the village is “Sherpur” which means home of lions.

Soil and agriculture 
The soil is very fertile and is suitable for farming. The principal crops are rice, barley, potato sweet potato, sunflower, corn, wheat, rice, garlic, onion, cotton and sugar cane.

Climate 
Like other areas of Punjab the summer is very hot and winter is fairly cold.

Economy
Agriculture is the backbone of the village almost all the people earn their living through farming. The area is famous for goats, sheep, ravi breed Water Buffalo and Sahiwal cow breed. The village has also the facility of a bank.
Most educated village in the area

Education 
The village has facility of one high school for girls and one for boys. People send their children to the neighbour town of Chichawatni, Kassowal, Iqbalnagar and Mianchannu for secondary and higher secondary education.

Religion 
100% of the village population are Muslims. The village has 6 mosque and one Eid gah for Eid prayer and also for funeral prayer.

Transport 
The means of transport in the village are bicycles and motorcycle, Rickshaws are used to go in village from Lahore multan road. Tractors and carts are used to transport goods.

Sports 
Kabaddi, cricket , football and hockey are popular games in the village. The village has its own team for hockey , football club and kabaddi.

Villages in Sahiwal District